Maurice Guiraud-Rivière (10 February 1881 – 1947) was a French sculptor. His work was part of the sculpture event in the art competition at the 1924 Summer Olympics.

References

1881 births
1947 deaths
19th-century French sculptors
20th-century French sculptors
French male sculptors
Olympic competitors in art competitions
Sculptors from Toulouse
19th-century French male artists